Mary Ann Aspinwall Owens (June 24, 1928 – November 21, 2005), of New York City, was an advocate of thematic collecting of postage stamps, such as collecting stamps showing birds, butterflies, ships, famous art, and so on. She was successful in her effort to officially help introduce thematic collecting into national and international philatelic exhibitions.

Collecting interests
Owens was a collector of thematic subjects on stamps, and was a pioneer in getting the philatelic community to accept thematic collecting as a valid branch of philately. She exhibited her collections at national and international philatelic events, and won numerous gold prizes. Her exhibit of “elephants on stamps” was the first thematic exhibit to win gold and large gold.

Philatelic activity
Owens served on the Citizens' Stamp Advisory Committee . She was accredited as a thematic judge by the American Topical Association, the American Philatelic Society, and the Fédération Internationale de Philatélie, and served as judge at many shows.

Honors and awards
In 1969 she was awarded the Distinguished Topical Philatelist Award by the American Topical Association, and, in 1978, she was elected to the Wisconsin Philatelic Hall of Fame. In 1991 she received the Luff Award of the American Philatelic Society in the category ''Exceptional Contributions to Philately'. She was named to the American Philatelic Society Hall of Fame in 2007.

See also
 Philately
 Philatelic literature
 Theodore E. Steinway

References
 Mary Ann Aspinwall Owens

1928 births
2005 deaths
American philatelists
People from New York City
American Philatelic Society
Women philatelists